Costas Ferris (born 18 April 1935) is a Greek film director, writer, actor, and producer. He wrote the lyrics of Aphrodite's Child's album 666. His 1983 film Rembetiko won the Silver Bear at the 34th Berlin International Film Festival.

Memberships and associations 

 European Film Academy, Member
 Balkan Film Festival, President of the Jury, 1981
 Alexandria International Film Festival, President of the Jury, 1996
 European Script Fund, Member of the Board, London, 1996-1997
 Greek Directors Society, Member of the Board, (multiple years)
 Greek Playwright Society, Member
 Société des Auteurs, Compositeurs et Éditeurs de Musique (SACEM)
 Federation of European Film Directors (La Fédération Européenne des Réalisateurs de l'Audiovisuel [FERA]), Member, Greece

Filmography

Television documentaries and series

Musicology

Awards and nominations 

Thessaloniki Film Festival

 1974: Greek Competition Award (Best Director) (The Murderess, Won)
 1978: Hellenic Association of Film Critics Award (Dyo Fengaria Ton Avgousto, Honorable Mention)
 1978: Greek Competition Award (Best Film) (Dyo Fengaria Ton Avgousto, Third Place)
 1983: Greek Competition Award (Best Film) (Rembetiko, Won)

Berlin International Film Festival

 1984: Silver Berlin Bear (Rembetiko, Won)
 1984: Golden Berlin Bear (Rembetiko, Nominated)

Alexandria International Film Festival

 1984: Grand Prix (Rembetiko, Won)

Valencia Film Festival

 1984: Special Jury Award (Rembetiko, Won)

References

External links 

1935 births
Living people
Greek film directors
Film directors from Cairo
Silver Bear for Best Director recipients